The Minnesota Golden Gophers softball team represents the University of Minnesota in National Collegiate Athletics Association (NCAA) Division I competition.  College softball became a varsity sport at the University of Minnesota in 1974.

History

Coaching history

Championships

Conference Championships

Conference tournament championships

Coaching staff

Roster

Notable players
Big Ten Player of the Year
Barb Drake, 1986
Kari Blank, 1991
Sara Groenewegen, 2015
Kendyl Lindaman, 2017, 2018

Big Ten Pitcher of the Year
Sara Groenewegen, 2014, 2017
Amber Fiser, 2019

Big Ten Freshman of the Year
Brenda Bixby, 1988
Sara Moulton, 2011
Sara Groenewegen, 2014
Maddie Houlihan, 2016
Kendyl Lindaman, 2017

Big Ten Coach of the Year
Linda Wells, 1988
Teresa Wilson, 1991
Jessica Allister, 2017

References